Stiklestad  is a village and parish in the municipality of Verdal in Trøndelag county, Norway. The village is mainly known as the site of the Battle of Stiklestad on 29 July 1030. Stiklestad Church is located in the village and it is assumed to have been erected on the exact spot where King Olaf II Haraldsson fell in the battle. The king was buried in Nidaros (Trondheim), canonised there on 3 August 1031, and later enshrined in Nidaros Cathedral. Following the Lutheran reformation of 1537 the saint's remains were removed and their precise resting-place has been unknown since 1568.

Name
The Old Norse form of the name is Stiklarstaðir. The first element is the genitive of a word stikl and the last element is staðir which means "farm". The word stikl might have been derived from the verb stikla which means "to jump", and this might have been the name of a nearby brook.

In the 13th century Gesta Danorum, or "The History of the Danes," Saxo Grammaticus recorded that the town was named after Stikla, a shield-maiden who was most famous for raiding with the Viking captain Rusla (Rusla was known as "The Red Maiden" for her brutal raids on Irish ships.) Stikla would have settled in the area at some point after her participation in the Battle of Clontarf in 1014.

Recent history
Given King Olav II’s role in the spread of Christianity in Norway, Stiklestad has been a significant site in Norwegian national culture since the 1030 battle. There has been an Olav memorial there since medieval times.

Between 1934 and 1944 Vidkun Quisling’s Nationalist Nasjonal Samling party held a number of rallies at Stiklestad, in an attempt to link the party to Norway’s historic past. A special Nasjonal Samling monument was inaugurated there in July 1944, before being demolished a year later after the fall of Quisling's government.

Since 1954 an annual the Saint Olav Drama, a re-enactment of the days leading up to the battle of 1030, has taken place at a specially built amphitheatre at Stiklestad.

In 1995 a Parliamentary decree established Stiklestad National Culture Centre (Stiklestad Nasjonale Kultursenter) at Stiklestad to promote the story and heritage of Saint Olaf, including the annual Saint Olav Drama. There is also a folk museum, that includes a medieval farm, and a hotel housed in the same building as the Culture Centre.

Panorama of the area

See also
 The Saint Olav Drama, an annual ceremony commemorating the historic Battle of Stiklestad
 Stiklestad Church, Twelfth Century Parish Church
 Nasjonal Samling monument, erected by Quisling in 1944

References

External links
 Stiklestad National Culture Centre

 
Verdal
Villages in Trøndelag